The Nokia X2 is an entry-level smartphone which was announced and released by Microsoft Mobile on 24 June 2014. It is the successor of the Nokia X, being the first smartphone running version 2.0 of the Android-based Nokia X platform operating system. The Nokia X family of Android phones was discontinued on July 17, 2014.

Specifications

Display
The Nokia X2 features a 4.3 inch (11 cm) ClearBlack IPS LCD display with WVGA resolution (480x800 pixels) that offers a pixel density of 217 ppi.

Software
Nokia X2 is based on AOSP (Android open source project) and comes with the Nokia X software platform 2.0, the successor of X software platform 1.0. It is a modified version of Android Jelly Bean 4.3 and can run all Android apps except Google service apps like Google Maps, Playstore, Gmail etc. By rooting one can use all Google services. Nokia X Platform 2.0 features a tile-based, customisable app launcher with a notification logging interface called Fastlane and supports multitasking through a card-based app switcher. Nokia X2 comes pre-loaded with Nokia Store, Facebook, Twitter, Outlook, OneDrive, Opera Mini and many more.

Hardware
The device has a 4.3 inch (11 cm) screen size. It is charged over USB, and a 3.5 mm audio jack is also included. It has an 1800 mAh removable battery which gives 23 days on standby, as well as a MicroSD slot and a memory card slot. The rear camera is 5 MP with LED flash, and there's also a 2.0 MP front camera. It has a 1.2 GHz dual-core Qualcomm Snapdragon 200 processor and 1 GB of RAM.

Changes from the past Nokia X phones
Nokia X2 has a lot of changes compared to the original. It is powered by a 1.2 GHz dual-core Snapdragon 200 SoC, a significant upgrade from the older 1 GHz dual-core Snapdragon S4 Play used in the previous Nokia X series. It features hardware back and home buttons, as opposed to the single back button on the past Nokia X devices. OS version has changed to Nokia X Software Platform 2.0 (based on Android 4.3 Jellybean) from 1.0 (Android Jellybean 4.1.2), with the amount of RAM increasing to 1 GB. The screen has changed to a 4.3 inch (11 cm) ClearBlack LCD panel, which is slightly bigger than the Nokia X (1st version) with a 4.0 inch (10 cm) screen.

Discontinuation of the Nokia X Platform
On July 17, 2014, Microsoft devices chief Stephen Elop announced that select future Nokia X devices would be shifted to the Windows Phone platform, effectively making them low-cost Lumia devices. This announcement lead to considerable speculation regarding the future of the Nokia X platform and the X series. However, the Nokia X2 was on sale in certain markets such as Pakistan and Russia as of 31 July 2014, and it will be the last Nokia X family device and the last Nokia-branded Android device. The Nokia N1 introduced in November 2014 and Nokia 6 in January 2017 are the first Nokia-branded tablet and smartphone respectively after the discontinuation of Nokia X family. Meanwhile, in Microsoft, the Microsoft Surface Duo launched in August 2020 as the company's first true Android mobile device.

References

Microsoft hardware
Mobile phones introduced in 2014
X2
Discontinued smartphones